Tabitha is an American fantasy sitcom and a spin-off of Bewitched that aired on ABC from September 10, 1977 to January 14, 1978. The series starred Lisa Hartman in the title role as Tabitha Stephens, the witch daughter of Samantha and Darrin Stephens who was introduced on Bewitched during its second season.

In the series, Tabitha is portrayed as a young woman working as a production assistant at a television station and living in Los Angeles. The supporting cast includes David Ankrum as Tabitha's brother, Adam, with whom she works; Karen Morrow as Tabitha's and Adam's meddlesome aunt, Minerva; Robert Urich as an egomaniacal talk show host who is a sometime love interest for Tabitha; and Mel Stewart as Tabitha's and Adam's cranky, but loveable, boss. Unlike Bewitched, which was a hit for ABC and aired for eight seasons, Tabitha failed to catch on with viewers and was canceled after eleven episodes.

Overview
Tabitha originated as a pilot that aired on ABC on April 24, 1976. The episode used the variant spelling Tabatha for the title, and starred Liberty Williams in the title role. Bruce Kimmel portrayed her brother, Adam Stephens. The major difference between the pilot and the series was that Adam was a full-fledged and mischievous warlock in the pilot, but was made a mortal for the series (thus making him the disapproving figure as Darrin had been). In the first pilot, Tabatha was an editorial assistant for the fictional Trend magazine, lived in San Francisco, and had a boyfriend named Cliff (Archie Hahn). She also contended with the supernatural antics of Adam. In situations that were very similar to "I, Darrin, Take This Witch, Samantha", the pilot episode of Bewitched, Tabatha tells Cliff that she is a witch, who at first does not believe her, but later discovers that she is telling the truth. Also, much like her mother did when she used her powers to deflect the unwanted affections of Sheila Sommers, her father's former fiancée, Tabatha deflects rival Dinah Nichols (Barbara Rhoades) from seducing Cliff.

The first pilot (directed by Bewitched producer/director William Asher) did not sell the series. A second pilot starring Lisa Hartman was produced that interested ABC who bought the series. In the second version, Hartman replaced Liberty Williams as Tabitha Stephens, the daughter of Samantha and Darrin. Tabitha is now a 20-something witch working as a production assistant at KXLA (which should not be confused with the real KXLA) television station in Los Angeles. Working with her is her now-older and mortal brother Adam (David Ankrum) who admonishes her use of witchcraft. Her previously unmentioned Aunt Minerva (Karen Morrow) pops in frequently to encourage her to use her witchcraft. Robert Urich is Tabitha's boss and romantic interest.

The revised Tabitha pilot aired on ABC on May 7, 1977. The series debuted on the fall schedule on September 10, 1977.

William Asher, who worked on the first pilot, had little to do with the second version of the series. While he directed a few episodes, namely the ones that feature Bernard Fox, George Tobias, and Sandra Gould as their original Bewitched characters, he otherwise remained as an advisor.

The series is explicitly set in the mid-late 1970s; even though footage of Tabitha as a toddler from the original series is incorporated into the opening credits and, as noted below, several characters from the original series made guest appearances played by their original actors, no narrative attempt is made to reconcile how someone born in the mid-1960s could be a college graduate in her early 20s only a decade later.

Characters

Main 

 Tabitha Stephens (Lisa Hartman) is the main character; she is the daughter of Samantha and Darrin Stephens and twitches her nose, much like her mother does, to invoke her magic spells.
Adam Stephens (David Ankrum) is Tabitha's older brother, although originally, he was younger; he is the son of Samantha and Darrin Stephens, is against Tabitha using witchcraft (much like Darrin, their father, was), and persuades Tabitha not to use her magic. He does love his sister, though.
Aunt Minerva (Karen Morrow) is Adam's and Tabitha's aunt; she is a meddlesome, but well-meaning busy-body and encourages Tabitha to use her magic; she is the mother figure for Tabitha, in lieu of Samantha and Endora.
Paul Thurston (Robert Urich) is the egotistical, somewhat obnoxious host of The Paul Thurston Show on the fictional TV station KXLA, where Tabitha works as a production assistant; he is a love interest for Tabitha, but it does not stop him from being a womanizer,
Marvin Decker (Mel Stewart) is producer of The Paul Thurston Show and Tabitha's cranky but lovable boss at KXLA.

Guest stars
Several Bewitched characters appeared on Tabitha. In the episode, "Tabitha's Weighty Problem", Bernard Fox reprises his role as Dr. Bombay, and again in the last episode, "Tabitha's Party", in which the character's first name, "Hubert" is revealed. The sixth episode, "The Arrival of Nancy", features George Tobias and Sandra Gould as Abner and Gladys Kravitz respectively. Dick Wilson, who played "various drunks" on Bewitched, appeared in the episodes "Halloween Show" and "Tabitha's Party". Mary Grace Canfield, who appeared on four episodes of Bewitched as Abner Kravitz's sister Harriet Kravitz, also guest starred as another character. Other guest stars were Werner Klemperer, Dack Rambo, Tracy Reed, Mary Wickes, and Fred Willard. In addition, photographs and footage of twin sisters Diane Murphy and Erin Murphy as Tabitha from the original Bewitched series were incorporated into the opening credits sequence.

Episodes

Pilots (1976 and 1977)

Season 1 (1977–78)

Reception and cancellation
The pilot aired in May, 1977, the season premiere on September 10 of that year, and the next episode not until November 12. The series finally aired regularly thereafter, on Saturdays at 8 p.m. EST. Ratings were initially good but began to drop off midway through the first season. In January 1978, ABC moved Tabitha from its Saturday night spot to Fridays at 8 p.m. (typically known as the Friday night death slot) where ratings continued to fall. The series ended its season ranked 81st out of 104 programs with a 14.8 Nielsen. It was the second lowest-rated program on the network's schedule. ABC canceled the series shortly thereafter, though reruns aired through August 1978.

Production notes
The pilot episode of Tabitha was produced by Ashmont Productions (the company owned by Elizabeth Montgomery and William Asher), and filmed at The Burbank Studios in Burbank, California. It was filmed with a single camera with an added laugh track.
After production of the pilot in 1976, Ashmont was closed down.

The series' theme song, "It Could Be Magic", was written by Jeff Barry and performed by Lisa Hartman. Jack Elliott, Allyn Ferguson and Dick DeBenedictis did the instrumental themes for the pilot episodes.

Home media
In 2005, to coincide with the release of the first season of Bewitched on DVD (and the release of the Bewitched feature film), Sony Pictures Home Entertainment released the entire run of Tabitha on DVD. The original Liberty Williams pilot is included as a special feature.

Sources

References

External links
 
 
 Bruce Kimmel reminisces about the first pilot

1976 American television series debuts
1978 American television series endings
1970s American sitcoms
American Broadcasting Company original programming
American fantasy television series
American television spin-offs
Bewitched
Fantasy comedy television series
Television series about witchcraft
Television about magic
Fictional characters who can teleport
Television series by Sony Pictures Television
Television shows set in Los Angeles
Television series about television
English-language television shows